Antonín "Toni" Šváb Jr. (born 9 June 1974) is a Czech former motorcycle speedway rider.

Career
Šváb won a silver medal in the 1999 Speedway World Team Cup for the Czech Republic. He has entered in three Individual Under-21 World Championship finals (1993–1995) and has started in the Speedway Grand Prix and the Speedway World Cup.

In 2001, he won the Argentine Championship.

On 8 January 2006 Šváb suffered very serious accident during a race in Argentina. He spent a month in a coma on life support and after recovery remained partially paralyzed on his left side, his short-term memory was damaged and eventually was given partial invalid retirement. In the middle of 2008, reflecting worsened health situation, Šváb decided to end his sport activities.

Family
Šváb's father, Antonín Šváb, Sr., also a speedway rider, was the winner of the Individual Ice Racing World Champion title in 1970.

Career details

World Championships 
 Individual Speedway World Championship and Speedway Grand Prix
 1999 - 29th place (2 pts in one event)
 2004 - 40th place (2 pts in one event)
 Team World Championship (Speedway World Team Cup and Speedway World Cup)
 1993 - 4th place in Group A
 1999 -  Pardubice - Runner-up (0 pts)
 2000 - 3rd place in Semi Final
 2003 -  - 6th place (4 pts in Race-off)
 Individual U-21 World Championship
 1993 -  Pardubice - 9th place (7 pts)
 1994 -  Elgane - 10th place (5 pts)
 1995 -  Tampere - 12th place (4 pts)

European Championships 
 Individual European Championship
 2003 -  Slaný - 11th place (6 pts)
 European Club Champions' Cup
 1998 -  Bydgoszcz - Runner-up (11 pts) for PSK Olymp Prague
 1999 -  Diedenbergen - 4th place (6 pts) for PSK Olymp Prague

See also 
 List of Speedway Grand Prix riders
 Czech Republic national speedway team

References 

1974 births
Living people
Czech speedway riders
Exeter Falcons riders
People from Vlašim
Sportspeople from the Central Bohemian Region